CosmoCaixa Barcelona is a science museum located in Barcelona, Catalonia, Spain. Formerly known as the Science Museum of Barcelona, it closed for renovations in 1998 and reopened in 2004 under its current name. The museum features a variety of exhibitions, permanent and temporary, that showcase the environment, nature, science, and space. CosmoCaixa also has a planetarium and exhibitions devoted to interaction such as touch and play for small children. It also has a bookstore, gift shop, library, teaching center and cafe. The museum is sponsored by la Caixa. Entry to the museum is free for students under 16. Adults too can enjoy at the museum with an entry ticket of 6 euros.

Building

The building was built between 1904-1909 by Josep Domènech i Estapà to serve as an asylum for the blind which closed in 1979. The building was renovated, retaining the original facade, and an expansion took place bringing the building to four times its original size.   An expansion of the building took place in 2004. CosmoCaixa has a large spiral walkway that takes visitors from the basement to the 5th floor. The centerpiece of the walkway is an Amazonian tree.

Exhibitions

CosmoCaixa has permanent and temporary exhibitions. It also houses a planetarium and has a free public square that allows the public to experience natural science through interactive exhibitions. Entry tickets to the Planetarium is 4 euros for adult and students alike. Tickets can also be bought at the museum on the first floor. 

Flooded Forest
A flooded forest which allows visitors to experience wet and dry environs of an Amazon rainforest. Ceiba trees are reproduced based on molds created by museum staff in Pará, Brazil. More than 100 living species are represented including birds, insects, frogs, piranhas, capybaras, and alligators.  

Geological Wall
Large cuts of geological formations are displayed along a wall showing erosion, volcanism, faults, sedimentation and related processes. The cuts of rock on display are primarily from Catalonia including potassium salt from Súria, sandstone from Berga and Mallorca, volcanic materials from Zona Volcànica de la Garrotxa Natural Park, and limestone from Besalú.  

The Universe Hall
The Universe's Hall, which is the main space in the Museum, shows a tour starting with the Big Bang to the most actuality themes, including modern medicine, wastes and robotics, throw the human evolution and other shapes of evolution and science. They all are showed by interactive modules that make easier their comprehension.

Clik and Flash
One of three interactive based exhibitions for young children, Clik and Flash uses games to encourage children to learn about science. The space is split into two rooms; Clik uses play, observation and deduction through smell, touch and sight and Flash uses technology to showcase exploration, environments, construction and electricity.

Touch, touch!
Touch, touch! houses living creatures from around the world and the Mediterranean. Museum staff and scientists present animals and plants from three environments.

Bubble Planetarium
An astronomy based exhibition for children ages 3–8.

Past exhibitions - historical spaces 
Touch, touch!
Touch, touch! houses living creatures from around the world and the Mediterranean. Museum staff and scientists present animals and plants from three environments.

The Hall of Matter
The Hall of Matter covers evolution starting with the Big Bang. It is broken into four sections: the origin of matter, the first living organism, the conquest of "symbolic intelligence", and the birth of civilization. The exhibit touches on gravitational wave, chaos theory, biology, mobility, neurons, intelligence and human evolution.

Gallery

See also
CaixaForum Barcelona
Museum of Natural Sciences of Barcelona
Jorge Wagensberg Lubinski
History of CosmoCaixa (German)

References

Museums in Barcelona
Science museums in Spain
Planetaria
La Caixa